This is a list of forts in the Indian state of Uttar Pradesh.

Gallery 

 
U
F
F